The Southeastern Collegiate Rugby Conference (SCRC) is an annual college rugby competition played every spring among 10 universities from the Southeastern Conference.

The SCRC was formed in December 2010 by a core group of founding schools — Georgia, Florida, South Carolina and Tennessee. By April 2011 the SCRC had expanded to 12 schools composed of the NCAA's Southeastern Conference (SEC).

The conference is led by SCRC Commissioner Marty Bradley.

Commercial success
The Southeastern Conference has enjoyed commercial success, announcing in October 2010, before conference play had even begun, that the SCRC had formed commercial partnership agreements with Adidas and the World Rugby Shop.
World Rugby Shop decided to sponsor the SCRC "because of the vision and potential of the league. Using established conference structures and rivalries is the future of the college rugby game in the U.S. and the SCRC will tap into a rich tradition of Southern rivalries at the major Southeastern Universities."

Schools
The current 10 member schools of the SCRC are in the table below.

The SCRC includes 10 of the 14 SEC schools. The other four schools are Missouri and Arkansas (which play rugby in the Heart of America conference), and Texas A&M and LSU (which play rugby in the Red River Conference). LSU was in the SCRC until 2014, but left before the 2015 season to join the Texas-based teams in the Red River Conference; Florida switched from the Eastern Division to the Western Division to balance the divisions with five teams each.

Results (regular season)
The following tables show the win–loss records of the various SCRC teams during conference play. The numbers in parentheses show that team's national ranking at the end of the season.

Results (post season)

In 2012, Florida beat Tennessee 22-14 at the championship match, held in Montgomery, Alabama, to win the inaugural SCRC title. Florida (#2 East) had beaten LSU (#1 West)  35-17 in one semifinal, while Tennessee (#1 East) had defeated Alabama (#2 West) 31-22 in the other semifinal.

In the 2013 semifinals, Tennessee (#1 East) defeated Ole Miss (#2 West) 36-32, and South Carolina (#2 East) defeated LSU (#1 West) 36-28. The final featured Tennessee defeating South Carolina 46-34.

In the 2014 spring semifinals, South Carolina (#1 East) defeated Auburn (#2 West) 41–5. In the other semifinal, LSU (#1 West) defeated Florida (#2 East) 54–27, marking the first time that a team from the Western Division reached the final. South Carolina defeated LSU in the final 41–24.

In the 2014 fall semifinals, South Carolina (#2 East) defeated Mississippi State (#1 West) 55–7. In the other semifinal, Alabama (#2 West) defeated Tennessee (#1 East) 37–25 in overtime, marking the first time that the top seed from the Eastern Division did not reach the final. South Carolina defeated Alabama in the final 50–22.

In the 2015 semifinals, South Carolina (#2 East) defeated Alabama (#1 West) 34–27, and Tennessee (#1 East) defeated Florida 30–13. Tennessee defeated South Carolina in the final 23–22.

Awards

National playoffs
Florida qualified for the 2012 Division 1-AA playoffs by virtue of its Southeast Conference championship, but lost to Florida State in the round of 32.  Tennessee received an at large bid to the 2012 Division 1-AA playoffs due to the strength of the Southeast Conference; in the national playoffs, Tennessee defeated Maryland 47–13 and Florida State 45–27 to reach the quarterfinals.

Tennessee and South Carolina both reached the 2013 national D1-AA playoffs. Both fell in the Round of 16 — Tennessee fell 17–30 to eventual champions Central Florida, and South Carolina lost 7–29 to in-state rival Clemson.

In the 2014 national D1-AA playoffs, the SCRC was represented by South Carolina, Georgia, and LSU. South Carolina beat Georgia 46–22 in the Round of 16, before falling 28–44 in the quarterfinals to eventual champions Central Florida. LSU lost in the Round of 16 to Central Florida by 19–50.

Southeastern Collegiate 7s Championship

The Southeastern Collegiate Rugby Sevens Championship was played every fall by universities from the southeastern United States until transitioning to a spring event beginning with the 2014/2015 academic season. Tennessee won the inaugural 2010 Southeastern Collegiate Rugby Sevens Championship and currently has the most titles at two.

References

External links
 

 
College rugby union competitions in the United States
2010 establishments in the United States
Sports leagues established in 2010